Bob Thiele Jr. (born July 3, 1955) is an American composer, musician and music producer of German descent who has contributed to many artists and TV shows. He is the son of producer Bob Thiele and singer Jane Harvey.

Career 

Bob Thiele Jr. has worked with Bette Middler (Bette of Roses, 1995, composer -  A Gift of love, 2015, composer), Katey Sagal (Covered, 2013, producer, composer - Well..., 1994, producer, composer), Curtis Stigers (To be loved, 1999, producer, guitar - Songs from "Brighter Days", 1999, producer, composer - Brighter Days, 1999, producer, composer), The White Buffalo, Paul Young (Simply The Best, 2000, composer), The Commitments (The commitments, 1991, composer - The Best of the Commitments, 2004, composer, The Commitments:Rarities Edition, 2010, composer), Ray Charles (My World, 1993, Associate producer, composer, synthesizer), Olivia Newton-John (The Rumour, 1998, Keyboards), The Dells (Passionate Breezes: The Best of the Dells, 1975-1991, 1995, composer - Anthology, 1999, composer), Peter Blakeley (The Pale Horse, 1994, producer, composer), Neville Brothers (Live on Planet Earth, 1994, composer), Aaron Neville (The Grand Tour, 1993, composer), Teresa Brewer (16 Most Requested Songs, 1991, producer, composer), Jane Harvey (The Undiscovered Jane Harvey, musician), RC and The Moonpie Band (Individually Wrapped, 2015, composer),  Jon Regen (Higher Ground, 2019, engineer), Peter Wolf (Midnight Souvenits, 2010, composer), Pat Benatar (Innamorate, 1997, composer) et al.

He was a member of the Royal Macadamians band along with Davitt Sigerson and John Philip Shenale/Phil Shenale they released the Experiments in Terror album (1990) creating an arty and idiosyncratic mixture of jazz-and-funk-infected tunes given a surrealistic spin.

Television 

Bob Thiele Jr. has worked for the music department of many TV series. such as Boston Public (2000-2004, music producer), The O.C. (2003-2007, music producer), The Buzz on Maggie (2005-2006, main theme composer), Three Wishes (2005, main theme composer), Bernard and Doris (2006, composer, original songs and additional music), The Office (2005-2013, theme, musician, creator of the band The Scrantones), Detroit 1-8-7 (2010-2011, music supervisor), Alcatraz (2012, music supervisor), Manhattan (2014-2016 music supervisor), Lucky 7 (2013-2014), Sin City Saints (2015, music supervisor), House Poor, The Bastard Executioner (2015), Genius (2017-2021, music supervisor), Superior Donuts (2017-2018, theme music composer), and Chance (2016-2017, music supervisor).

For seven seasons he oversaw Sons of Anarchys music (2008- 2014, music supervisor, composer of the main title song, This Life). He led and founded its house band The Forest Rangers. which includes the show's music composer Bob Thiele Jr, Greg Leisz (guitar/banjo), John Philip Shenale (keyboards), Lyle Workman (guitar), Dave Way (recording Engineer and Sergeant at Arms), Davey Faragher (bass), Brian Macleod (drums) and Velvet Revolver guitarist Dave Kushner. Bob Thiele Jr. helped shaping the series unique music style which consists of a Jambalaya of original music and covers from established artists but mostly from indie artists and bands because of the very small budget he had to work with. This made him go to a different source and forced him to go to independents. The music of the show parallels the importance of visuals and the acting becoming a character on its own terms while introducing new music which does not underscore the scene but it is leading it. Bob Thiele Jr. is a vivid example of an era where the music is determined by creative storytellers and television is breaking bands in the way that FM radio once did by bringing new artists to the attention of a vast audience. Three EPs were released: Sons of Anarchy: North Country (2009), Sons of Anarchy: Shelter and Sons of Anarchy: The King Is Gone. Thanks to their success four soundtrack albums followed along with numerous singles: Songs of Anarchy: Music from Sons of Anarchy Seasons 1-4 (2011, producer, composer), Sons of Anarchy: Songs of Anarchy Vol.2 (2012, producer, composer), Sons of Anarchy: Songs of Anarchy Vol.3 (2013, producer, composer), Sons of Anarchy: Songs of Anarchy Vol. 4 (2015, producer, piano, guitar). The SoA experience gave birth to the Land Ho! album (2015), a passion project which came into fruition thanks to a successful PledgeMusic campaign for its recording and release.

Bob Thiele Jr. is the music supervisor and the composer of main title theme of Mayans M.C. The soundtrack of the series is a hybrid between American musical genres (hip-hop, rock, metal, singer-songwriter, etc.) and Latino music, both modern and traditional. Songs from the tv series were released as albums and singles such as Señor [From "Mayans M.C."] (2020, producer), En Mi Camino [From "Mayans M.C."] (2020, composer, producer), Black Is Black [From "Mayans M.C."] (2020, producer), I Say a Little Prayer (Rezo una Oración por Ti) [From "Mayans M.C."] (2020, producer).

Motion pictures 
Bob Thiele Jr. has worked for plenty of motion pictures such as: The Five Heartbeats (1991, songwriter, Robert Townsend/Director), I still know what you did last Summer (1998, songwriter, Danny Cannon/Director), The Waiting Game (1999, songwriter, Ken Liotti/Director),  Boys and Girls (2000, songwriter, Robert Iscove/Director), Out of Line (2001, songwriter, Johanna Demetrakas/Director), Bernard and Doris (2006, additional music, songwriter, Bob Balaban/Director),  Bad Country (2014, songwriter, Chris Brinker/Director), There's Always Woodstock (2014, music supervisor, Rita Merson/Director),  Bad Hurt (2015, music supervisor, songwriter, Mark Kemble/Director),  A Boyfriend For My Wife (2016, songwriter, Julia Rezende/Director).

Awards and nominations 
Bob Thiele Jr. was nominated once for a daytime Emmy Award and 3 times for a Prime Time Emmy Award. He has won the Hollywood Music in Media Award twice and an ASCAP Film and Television Music award three times.

In 2009 Bob Thiele Jr. was nominated for a Primetime Emmy Award for his work on Sons of Anarchy. The song "This Life", written by him, guitarist Dave Kushner, Curtis Stigers and show creator Kurt Sutter, was nominated at the category "Outstanding Original Main Title Theme Music" while it was performed by Curtis Stigers and The Forest Rangers. Bob Thiele Jr. was nominated for an OFTA television award for "This Life" at Best New Theme Song in a Series, Motion Picture or Miniseries category.

In 2014 he was nominated again for a Primetime Emmy Award for Outstanding Original Music and Lyrics for his song "Day is Gone", which was on the soundtrack of the Sons of Anarchy episode "A Mother's Work" (Season 6, Episode 13). Noah Gundersen and Kurt Sutter co-wrote the song which was performed by Noah Gundersen and The Forest Rangers.

In 2015 Bob Thiele Jr. was nominated for a third time for a Primetime Emmy Award for his song "Come Join the Murder" from the Sons of Anarchy episode "Papa's Goods" (Season 7, episode 13). Jake Smith and Kurt Sutter co-wrote the song which was performed by The White Buffalo and The Forest Rangers.

References

External links

1955 births
American multi-instrumentalists
Living people
Place of birth missing (living people)
Sons of Anarchy
ASCAP composers and authors
21st-century multi-instrumentalists
American record producers
American male songwriters
American people of German descent